Main Street Historic District is a national historic district located at Rutherfordton, Rutherford County, North Carolina.  It encompasses 43 contributing buildings and 1 contributing object in the central business district of Rutherfordton.  The district developed from about 1898 to 1945, and includes notable examples of Classical Revival and Colonial Revival style architecture. Located in the district is the separately listed Rutherford County Courthouse designed by Louis H. Asbury (1877-1975). Other notable contributing buildings include the U.S. Post Office (1931), the Norris Public Library (1933), (former) Rutherford County Jail, Commercial National Bank, Keeter Hardware Company Building, Geer Commercial Building, Southern Hotel Company Building, Geer-Warlick Motor Company Building, and City Hall (1925) designed by Milburn, Heister & Company.

It was added to the National Register of Historic Places in 1995.

Gallery

References

Historic districts on the National Register of Historic Places in North Carolina
Neoclassical architecture in North Carolina
Colonial Revival architecture in North Carolina
Buildings and structures in Rutherford County, North Carolina
National Register of Historic Places in Rutherford County, North Carolina
Rutherfordton, North Carolina